The Coll de la Font de Cera is a mountain pass on the BP-5002 road across the Catalan Coastal Range from El Masnou to Granollers. The pass lies between the municipality of Alella, in the comarca of Maresme, and the municipality of Vallromanes, in the comarca of Vallès Oriental. Both municipalities are in the province of Barcelona, Catalonia, Spain.

The GR 92 long-distance footpath, which roughly follows the length of the Mediterranean coast of Spain, has a staging point on the pass.

References 

Font de Cera